Can't Count Me Out is the sixth studio album by American R&B/jazz singer Miki Howard, released in 1997 under Hush Records. Howard's first studio recording in four years, the album contains a mixture of soulful ballads, some groovy R&B and a duet with father Clay Graham of gospel group, The Pilgrim Jubilees. Also featured are a few cover tunes, including  Janis Ian's "At Seventeen" produced by Robby Takac, member of the rock group Goo Goo Dolls, and Stevie Wonder's "I Love Every Little Thing About You", a duet with pop/R&B singer Terence Trent D'Arby with Chaka Khan singing background vocals.
The album also features the track, "Sunshine", written by R&B singer/songwriter Brenda Russell.

Track listing

Singles
"Something I Never Had"
"I Love Every Little Thing About You"

References

1997 albums
Miki Howard albums
Hush Records albums